Wrestling at the 2004 Summer Olympics took place in the Ano Liosia Olympic Hall and was split into two disciplines, Freestyle and Greco-Roman which are further divided into different weight categories. Men competed in both disciplines whereas women only took part in the Freestyle event with 18 gold medals being contested in all. This was the first Olympic Games that included women's wrestling events on the program.

Qualification

Medalists

Men's freestyle

Men's Greco-Roman

Women's freestyle

Medal table

Participating nations
A total of 342 wrestlers from 66 nations competed at the Athens Games:

References

External links
Official result book – Wrestling

 
2004 Summer Olympics events
Olympics
2004
Wrestling competitions in Greece